Nguyễn Huy Hùng (born 2 March 1992) is a Vietnamese footballer who plays as a central midfielder for SHB Đà Nẵng and the Vietnam national football team.

Honours
Quảng Nam
V.League 1: 2017
Vietnamese National Cup: Runner-up 2019
Vietnamese Super Cup: 2018
Vietnam U23
Southeast Asian Games: Bronze medal: 2015
Vietnam 
AFF Championship: 2018

International goals

References

External links 
 

1992 births
Living people
Vietnamese footballers
Vietnam international footballers
V.League 1 players
Hanoi FC players
Quang Nam FC players
SHB Da Nang FC players
Association football midfielders
Footballers at the 2014 Asian Games
Southeast Asian Games bronze medalists for Vietnam
Southeast Asian Games medalists in football
2019 AFC Asian Cup players
Competitors at the 2015 Southeast Asian Games
Asian Games competitors for Vietnam